Colton Miller Iverson (born June 29, 1989) is an American professional basketball player for the Akita Northern Happinets of the Japanese B.League. He played college basketball for the University of Minnesota and Colorado State.

College career
Iverson, a 7'0" center, attended Yankton High School in Yankton, South Dakota and originally chose to play basketball at the University of Minnesota for coach Tubby Smith.  At Minnesota, Iverson served as a key role player, averaging 5.3 points and 4.3 rebounds per game.

Following his junior year in 2010–11 and seeking more playing time, Iverson decided to transfer to another program for his final season of eligibility, ultimately deciding on Colorado State.  At CSU, Iverson became the focal point of the offense, leading the team in scoring (14.2 points per game) and rebounding (9.8 per game). In 2013, Iverson led the Rams to the round of 32 in the NCAA tournament for the first time since 1989. At the close of the season, Iverson was named first team All-Mountain West and an honorable mention All-American by the Associated Press.

Professional career

2013–14 season
On June 27, 2013, Iverson was selected with the 53rd overall pick in the 2013 NBA draft by the Indiana Pacers. He was later traded to the Boston Celtics on draft night. In July 2013, he joined the Celtics for the 2013 NBA Summer League.

On August 2, 2013, he signed a one-year deal with Beşiktaş Integral Forex of the Turkish Basketball League.

2014–15 season
In July 2014, Iverson re-joined the Boston Celtics for the 2014 NBA Summer League. On August 12, 2014, he signed a one-year deal with an option for a second-year deal with Laboral Kutxa Baskonia of Spain. In his first year in the Liga Endesa, he became the MVP of the week in the round 17, after performing 14 points and 15 rebounds against Rio Natura Monbus Obradoiro.

2015–16 season
On July 17, 2015, Laboral Kutxa Baskonia used the option on his contract to keep him for the 2015–16 season. However, on August 14, he signed with Pınar Karşıyaka of Turkey and Baskonia took legal action against him.

On August 25, 2016, the Celtics renounced their rights to Iverson, leaving him available to join another NBA team.

2016–17 season
On September 8, 2016, Iverson signed a one-year contract with Israeli club Maccabi Tel Aviv. Iverson helped Maccabi to win the 2017 Israeli State Cup.

2017–18 season
On January 24, 2018, Iverson returned to Spain for a second stint, signing with MoraBanc Andorra for the rest of the season.

2018–19 season
On July 16, 2018, Iverson signed with Iberostar Tenerife for the 2018–19 season.

2019–20 season
On July 11, 2019, Iverson agreed to terms with Zenit Saint Petersburg for the 2019–20 season. He competed in the EuroLeague and the Russian VTB United League. Iverson averaged 6 points and 4 rebounds per game. He parted ways with the team on July 10, 2020.

2020–21 season
On September 10, 2020, Iverson signed with the New Zealand Breakers of the Australian National Basketball League (NBL) for the 2020–21 season.

2021–22 season
On June 24, 2021, Iverson signed with the Akita Northern Happinets of the Japanese B.League.

Career statistics

Euroleague

|-
| style="text-align:left;"| 2014–15
| style="text-align:left;"| Baskonia
| 24 || 20 || 20.8 || .617 || .000 || .544 || 6.0 || .5 || .5 || .7 || 7.0 || 10.0
|-
| style="text-align:left;"| 2015–16
| style="text-align:left;"| Karşıyaka
| 9 || 6 || 17.1 || .581 || .000 || .607 || 4.9 || .6 || .6 || .6 || 9.9 || 11.0
|-
| style="text-align:left;"| 2016–17
| style="text-align:left;"| Maccabi
| 30 || 24 || 20.4 || .613 || .000 || .571 || 5.3 || .6 || .8 || .2 || 8.0 || 10.3
|- class="sortbottom"
| style="text-align:left;"| Career
| style="text-align:left;"|
| 24 || 20 || 20.8 || .617 || .000 || .544 || 6.0 || .5 || .5 || .7 || 7.0 || 10.0

Eurocup

|-
| style="text-align:left;"| 2013–14
| style="text-align:left;"| Beşiktaş
| 18 || 18 || 20.57 || .565 || .000 || .474 || 5.5 || .7 || .6 || .6 || 8.8 || 9.5
|- class="sortbottom"
| style="text-align:left;"| Career
| style="text-align:left;"|
| 18 || 18 || 20.57 || .565 || .000 || .474 || 5.5 || .7 || .6 || .6 || 8.8 || 9.5

Domestic leagues 

|-
| style="text-align:left;"| 2013–14
| style="text-align:left;"| Beşiktaş
| 29 || 29 || 14.9 || .511 || .000 || .494 || 4.3 || .6 || .6 || .2 || 6.2 || –
|-
| style="text-align:left;"| 2014–15
| style="text-align:left;"| Baskonia
| 37 || 33 || 20 || .600 || .000 || .640 || 5.7 || .4 || .7 || .5 || 7.0 || 9.6
|- class="sortbottom"
| style="text-align:left;"| Career
| style="text-align:left;"|
| 33 || 31 || 17.5 || .555 || .000 || .567 || 5 || .5 || .7 || .4 || 6.6 || 9.6

References

External links
 Liga ACB profile
 Colorado State Rams bio
 eurobasket.com profile
 EuroLeague profile
 

1989 births
Living people
Akita Northern Happinets players
American expatriate basketball people in Israel
American expatriate basketball people in Japan
American expatriate basketball people in New Zealand
American expatriate basketball people in Russia
American expatriate basketball people in Spain
American expatriate basketball people in Turkey
American men's basketball players
Basketball players from South Dakota
BC Andorra players
Expatriate basketball people in Andorra
American expatriate basketball people in Andorra
BC Zenit Saint Petersburg players
Beşiktaş men's basketball players
CB Canarias players
Centers (basketball)
Colorado State Rams men's basketball players
Indiana Pacers draft picks
Karşıyaka basketball players
Liga ACB players
Maccabi Tel Aviv B.C. players
Minnesota Golden Gophers men's basketball players
New Zealand Breakers players
People from Aberdeen, South Dakota
Saski Baskonia players